Gold Spike can refer to:
Gold Spike (property)
The Golden spike that was used to commemorate the completion of the First transcontinental railroad

See also: Golden spike (disambiguation)